Qaleh-ye Baha ol Din (also Romanized as Qal‘eh-ye Bahā’ ol Dīn and Qal‘eh-ye Bahā’ od Dīn; also known as Qal‘eh Bādī, Qal‘eh Bāi, and Qal‘eh-ye Bāy) is a village in Chalanchulan Rural District, Silakhor District, Dorud County, Lorestan Province, Iran. At the 2006 census, its population was 226, in 57 families.

References 

Towns and villages in Dorud County